Parmelinella schimperiana is a species of foliose lichen in the family Parmeliaceae. It is found in Kenya, Cameroon, and South India, where it typically grows on bark, but less frequently on rock.

Taxonomy
The lichen was described as a new species in 2016 by lichenologists Paul Kirika and Pradeep Divakar. The type specimen was collected near Ngutwa village, Wote (Eastern Province, Kenya). Here it was found growing on bark in dry woodland. The specific epithet schimperiana honours German botanist Georg Wilhelm Schimper, who was the first to scientifically collect lichens in East Africa.

Description
The results of standard chemical spot test are cortex K+ (yellow); medulla K+ (yellow turning red), C−, KC−, P+ (orange-red). Secondary chemicals present in the lichen are secalonic acid A and atranorin in the upper cortex and salazinic acid in the medulla.

The lichen resembles the widely distributed species Parmelinella wallichiana, but has smaller ascospores (measuring 5–10 by 5–7.5 μm compared to 15–20 by 9–14 μm in P. wallichiana) and a more restricted distribution.

References

Parmeliaceae
Lichen species
Lichens described in 2016
Lichens of Cameroon
Lichens of India
Lichens of Kenya
Taxa named by Pradeep Kumar Divakar